The House at 118 Greenwood Street in Wakefield, Massachusetts is a rare well-preserved example of a Stick-style house.  The -story house was built c. 1875, and features Stick-style bracing elements in its roof gables, hooded windows, with bracketing along those hoods and along the porch eave.  Sawtooth edging to sections of board-and-batten siding give interest to the base of the gables, and on a projecting window bay.  The house was built in an area that was farmland until the arrival of the railroad in the mid-19th century.

The house was listed on the National Register of Historic Places in 1989.

See also
National Register of Historic Places listings in Wakefield, Massachusetts
National Register of Historic Places listings in Middlesex County, Massachusetts

References

Houses in Wakefield, Massachusetts
Houses on the National Register of Historic Places in Wakefield, Massachusetts
Queen Anne architecture in Massachusetts
Houses completed in 1875